Sylmar Charter High School is a charter school in the northeast San Fernando Valley in the Sylmar district of Los Angeles, California.  Established in 1961, it is part of the Los Angeles Unified School District, District 2, and serves more than 3,600 students in grades 9–12. The school mascot is the Spartans.

History
Sylmar first opened in 1961. Sylmar Magnet School opened September 13, 1994, serving 396 students annually. In 2016, Sylmar High School became a Charter High School.

Athletics
Sylmar's athletic program has flourished in the Los Angeles City Section. Particularly in football, the Spartans have won two city titles under former head coach Jeff Engilman, in 1992 and 1994. Since then, the Spartans have had plenty of 10+ win seasons making playoffs but have fallen short of advancing to the championship games. Engilman retired from coaching in 2003 with London Woodfin, the offensive coordinator, taking the reins. In Woodfin's first season as head coach in 2004 the team went 9–3 and lost to Dorsey High School 55–13 in the playoffs. The closest Sylmar has gotten to making the championship game was in 2005, losing to Taft High School 48–28 in the semi-finals when Sylmar finished the season 12–1. Sylmar had running back C. J. Gable at the time. In 2014, the Sylmar football team made it to the Division 2 championship game, losing 58–31 to Hamilton High School. It has two City Division-I baseball titles: 1973 and 1980.

Notable alumni

 Chuy Bravo, television personality 
 Brandon Browner, football player
 Marco Estrada, baseball player
 CJ Gable, football player
 Tyler Honeycutt, basketball player
 Durell Price, football player
 Jeff Scott Soto, musician (class of 1983)
 Pete Redfern, baseball player
 Brian Roberson, football player
 Johnny Whitaker, actor (class of 1977) 
 George Wrighster, football player
 Suzette Martinez Valladares, California State Assemblywoman

References

External links 

 

Los Angeles Unified School District schools
Educational institutions established in 1961
High schools in the San Fernando Valley
High schools in Los Angeles
Public high schools in California
Sylmar, Los Angeles
1961 establishments in California